Floyd Chester Bennett (2 April 1919 – 26 November 1997) was an Australian cricketer. He played eight first-class matches for South Australia and Western Australia between 1945/46 and 1951/52.

References

External links
 

1919 births
1997 deaths
Australian cricketers
South Australia cricketers
Western Australia cricketers
Cricketers from Perth, Western Australia